The search coil magnetometer or induction magnetometer, based on an inductive sensor (also known as inductive loop and inductive coil), is a magnetometer which measures the varying magnetic flux. An inductive sensor connected to a conditioning electronic circuit constitutes a search coil magnetometer. It is a vector magnetometer which can measure one or more components of the magnetic field. A classical configuration uses three orthogonal inductive sensors. The search-coil magnetometer can measure magnetic field from mHz up to hundreds of MHz.

Principle 

The inductive sensor is based on Faraday's law of induction. The temporal variation of the Magnetic Flux  through a N turns circuit will induce a voltage  which follows 

which can be expressed in a simpler way

by assuming that the induced magnetic field B is homogeneous over a section S (the Magnetic flux will be expressed ).

The induced voltage may be increased several ways:
 increase the surface (S),
 increase the turn number (N),
 use a ferromagnetic core.

Search coil using a ferromagnetic core 

When a coil is wound around a ferromagnetic core, that increases the sensitivity of the sensor thanks to the apparent permeability of the ferromagnetic core.

Apparent permeability 
The magnetic amplification, known as apparent permeability , is the result of the magnetization of the ferromagnetic core response to an external magnetic field. The magnetization is reduced by the demagnetizing field.

where  is the relative permeability,  is the demagnetizing coefficient in the z direction.

The induced voltage will be written

The demagnetizing coefficient can easily be computed in the case of simple shapes (spheres and ellipsoids).

Applications 

 Eye tracker: a search coil is used to measure eye movement using coils that are embedded into a contact lens.
 Education
 Non Destructive Testing
 Magnetotellurics
 Space research
 Natural electromagnetic waves observations on Earth.

References

 Pavel Ripka,  Magnetic Sensors and Magnetometers, Artech House Publishers 
 S. Tumanski, Induction Coil Sensors - a Review

See also
Waves (Juno) (Uses a magnetic search coil)

Vision
Magnetometers